This is a list of rivers in the U.S. state of WashingtonAllen creek.

By drainage basin
This list is arranged by drainage basin. Respective tributaries are indented under each larger stream's name and are ordered downstream to upstream.

Fraser River (British Columbia)
Sumas River
Saar Creek
Chilliwack River
Silesia Creek
Depot Creek
Little Chilliwack River

Dakota Creek
California Creek
Lummi River
Nooksack River
Tenmile Creek
Anderson Creek
South Fork Nooksack River
Skookum Creek
Middle Fork Nooksack River
North Fork Nooksack River
Canyon Creek
Glacier Creek
Dead Horse Creek
Wells Creek
Ruth Creek
Whatcom Creek
Padden Creek
Samish River

Puget Sound

Whidbey Basin
Skagit River
Finney Creek
Grandy Creek
Baker River 
Thunder Creek
Rocky Creek
Sulphur Creek
Swift Creek
Shannon Creek
Blum Creek
Sulphide Creek
Crystal Creek
Bald Eagle Creek
Jackman Creek
Sauk River
Suiattle River
Big Creek
Buck Creek
Lime Creek
Downey Creek
Sulphur Creek
Milk Creek
Dusty Creek
Chocolate Creek
Dan Creek
Clear Creek
Helena Creek
White Chuck River
Pugh Creek
Camp Creek
South Fork Sauk River
Elliott Creek
North Fork Sauk River
Lost Creek
Sloan Creek
Cadet Creek
Illabot Creek
Cascade River 
Jordan Creek
Marble Creek
Kindy Creek
North Fork Cascade River
South Fork Cascade River
Middle Fork Cascade River
Diobsud Creek
Bacon Creek
Goodell Creek
Newhalem Creek
Stetattle Creek
Thunder Creek
Colonial Creek
Ruby Creek
Canyon Creek
Slate Creek
Granite Creek
Big Beaver Creek
Devils Creek
Three Fools Creek
Little Beaver Creek
Stillaguamish River
Pilchuck Creek
North Fork Stillaguamish
Deer Creek
Boulder River
Squire Creek
South Fork Stillaguamish
Jim Creek
Canyon Creek
Tulalip Creek
Snohomish River
Quilceda Creek
Pilchuck River
Little Pilchuck Creek
French Creek
Skykomish River
 Woods Creek
 West Fork Woods Creek
 Youngs Creek
Sultan River
Chaplain Creek
South Fork Sultan River
Wallace River
 Olney Creek
North Fork Skykomish River
Salmon Creek
Silver Creek
Troublesome Creek
West Cady Creek
Goblin Creek
Quartz Creek
Pass Creek
South Fork Skykomish River
Barclay Creek
Index Creek
Money Creek
Miller River
West Fork Miller River
East Fork Miller River
Camp Robber Creek
Maloney Creek
Beckler River
Rapid River
Meadow Creek
North Fork Rapid River
Fourth of July Creek
Evergreen Creek
Foss River
West Fork Foss River
East Fork Foss River
Tye River
Martin Creek
Deception Creek
Surprise Creek
Scenic Creek
Tunnel Creek
Snoqualmie River
Cherry Creek
Tolt River
North Fork Tolt River
South Fork Tolt River
Griffin Creek
Patterson Creek
Raging River
Tokul Creek
South Fork Snoqualmie River
Boxley Creek
Hansen Creek
North Fork Snoqualmie River
Tate Creek
Sunday Creek
Lennox Creek
Middle Fork Snoqualmie River
Granite Creek
Pratt River
Rainy Creek
Taylor River
Quartz Creek
Dingford Creek
Burnboot Creek

Central Basin
Shell Creek
Shelleberger Creek
Deer Creek
Boeing Creek
Pipers Creek
Lake Washington Ship Canal/Lake Washington
Taylor Creek
Ravenna Creek
Thornton Creek
McAleer Creek
Lyon Creek
Sammamish River
Swamp Creek
Scriber Creek
North Creek
Penny Creek
Mill Creek
Sitka Creek
Bear Creek
Cottage Lake Creek
Lake Sammamish
Issaquah Creek
East Fork Issaquah Creek
Juanita Creek
Forbes Creek
Yarrow Creek
Kelsey Creek
Coal Creek
May Creek
Cedar River
Taylor Creek
Rex River
Duwamish River
Longfellow Creek
Black River (historical)
Cedar River (historical)
Green River
White River (historical)
Soos Creek
Newaukum Creek
North Fork Green River
Smay Creek
Sunday Creek
Fauntleroy Creek
Des Moines Creek
Massey Creek
McSorley Creek
Redondo Creek
Lakota Creek
Joes Creek
Hylebos Creek
Wapato Creek
Puyallup River
Swan Creek
Clear Creek
Clarks Creek
Stuck River
White River
Clearwater River
Greenwater River
West Fork White River
Huckleberry Creek
Carbon River
Voight Creek
South Prairie Creek
Wilkeson Creek
Kapowsin Creek
Mowich River
Puget Creek

South Basin
Chambers Creek
Clover Creek
Sequalitchew Creek
Nisqually River
Muck Creek
Yelm Creek
Tanwax Creek
Ohop Creek
Mashel River
Little Mashel River
Busy Wild Creek
Little Nisqually River
Mineral Creek
Big Creek
Catt Creek
Kautz Creek
Paradise River
Van Trump Creek
Woodland Creek
Indian Creek
Deschutes River
Kennedy Creek
Mill Creek
Goldsborough Creek
Sherwood Creek

Hood Canal, Admiralty Inlet
Union River
Mission Creek
Tahuya River
Skokomish River
North Fork Skokomish River (Lake Cushman)
South Fork Skokomish River
Vance Creek
Dewatto River
Hamma Hamma River
Duckabush River
Dosewallips River
Big Quilcene River
Tunnel Creek
Little Quilcene River
Chimacum Creek

Strait of Juan de Fuca
Snow Creek
Dungeness River
Gray Wolf River
Cameron Creek
McDonald Creek
Morse Creek
Ennis Creek
Elwha River
Indian Creek
Little River
Lillian River
Lost River
Goldie River
Hayes River
Lyre River
East Twin River
West Twin River
Deep Creek
Pysht River
Clallam River
Hoko River
Sekiu River
Sail River

Pacific Coast
Waatch River
Sooes River
Ozette River
Big River
Quillayute River
Dickey River
Sol Duc River
Bear Creek
North Fork Sol Duc River
Bogachiel River
Calawah River
North Fork Calawah River
Sitkum River
Goodman Creek
Hoh River
South Fork Hoh River
Mount Tom Creek
Kalaloch Creek
Queets River
Clearwater River
Snahapish River
Solleks River
Salmon River
Matheny Creek
Sams River
Thletshy Creek
Raft River
Quinault River
Cook Creek
Ten O'Clock Creek
North Fork Quinault Creek
Rustler Creek
Moclips River
Joe Creek
Copalis River

Grays Harbor
Humptulips River
Big Creek
Stevens Creek
West Fork Humptulips River
East Fork Humptulips River
Hoquiam River
Chehalis River
Wishkah River
Wynoochee River
Satsop River
East Fork Satsop River
Decker Creek
Bingham Creek
Middle Fork Satsop River
West Fork Satsop River
Canyon River
Cloquallum Creek
Delezene Creek
Mox Chehalis Creek
Porter Creek
Rock Creek
Cedar Creek
Garrard Creek
Black River
Beaver Creek
Waddell Creel
Scatter Creek
Lincoln Creek (entirely in Lewis County)
Skookumchuck River
Hanaford Creek
Salzer Creek
Newaukum River
North Fork Newaukum River
Middle Fork Newaukum River
South Fork Newaukum River
Stearns Creek
Bunker Creek
South Fork Chehalis River
Lake Creek
Stillman Creek
Elk Creek
Crim Creek
Newskah Creek
Johns River
Elk River

Willapa Bay
Cedar River
North River
Lower Salmon Creek
Little North River
Vesta Creek
Fall River
Smith Creek
Elkhorn Creek
Willapa River
South Fork Willapa River
Wilson Creek
Mill Creek
Fork Creek
Bone River
Niawiakum River
Palix River
Canon River
North Nemah River
Williams Creek
South Nemah River
Middle Nemah River
Naselle River
South Naselle River
Salmon Creek
Bear River

Columbia River
Columbia River

Lower Columbia Basin
Wallacut River
Chinook River
Deep River
Grays River
Skamokawa Creek
Elochoman River
Abernethy Creek
Germany Creek
Coal Creek
Cowlitz River
Coweeman River
Ostrander Creek
Arkansas Creek
Toutle River
South Fork Toutle River
North Fork Toutle River
Green River
Hoffstadt Creek
Olequah Creek
Lacamas Creek
Salmon Creek
Cedar Creek
Winston Creek
Tilton River
Cispus River
Quartz Creek
Iron Creek
Yellowjacket Creek
North Fork Cispus River
East Canyon Creek
Adams Creek
Muddy Fork
Walupt Creek (Walupt Creek Falls)
Kiona Creek
Silver Creek
Johnson Creek
Skate Creek
Butter Creek
Lake Creek (Packwood Lake)
Muddy Fork Cowlitz River
Ohanapecosh River
Summit Creek
Clear Fork Cowlitz River
Kalama River
Lewis River
East Fork Lewis River
Cedar Creek
Canyon Creek
Siouxon Creek
Pine Creek
Muddy River
Clear Creek
Clearwater Creek
Quartz Creek
Gee Creek
Lake River
Salmon Creek
Woodin Creek / Weaver Creak
Burnt Bridge Creek
Washougal River
Lacamas Creek
Little Washougal River
West Fork Washougal River
Rock Creek
Wind River
Panther Creek
Trout Creek
Falls Creek
Little White Salmon River
White Salmon River
Rattlesnake Creek
Trout Lake Creek
Buck Creek
Cascade Creek
Dry Creek
Gilmer Creek
Hangman Creek
Mill Creek
Klickitat River
Swale Creek
Little Klickitat River
Bowman Creek
Mill Creek
Butler Creek
Summit Creek
White Creek
Brush Creek
Outlet Creek
Trout Creek
Big Muddy Creek
Surveyors Creek
West Fork
Diamond Fork
Rock Creek

Walla Walla and Snake River Basins
Walla Walla River
Touchet River
Patit Creek
South Fork Touchet River
North Fork Touchet River
Wolf Fork
Robinson Fork
Mud Creek
Dry Creek
Mill Creek
Cottonwood Creek
Snake River
Palouse River
Cow Creek
Union Flat Creek
Rock Creek
Imbler Creek
Cottonwood Creek
Kamiache Creek
Pleasant Valley Creek
Pine Creek
Thorn Creek
Rebel Flat Creek
South Fork Palouse River
Tucannon River
Pataha Creek
Tumalum Creek
Cummings Creek
Alkali Flat Creek
Meadow Creek
Deadman Creek
Penawawa Creek
Alpowa Creek
Asotin Creek
George Creek
Charley Creek
South Fork Asotin Creek
Lick Creek
Grande Ronde River
Joseph Creek
Menatchee Creek
Crooked Creek
Wenaha River (North Fork)

Central Columbian Basin

Yakima River
Amon Creek
Satus Creek
Logy Creek
Toppenish Creek
Simcoe Creek
Ahtanum Creek
Wide Hollow Creek
Naches River
Cowiche Creek
Tieton River
Rimrock Lake
South Fork Tieton River
North Fork Tieton River
Rattle Snake Creek
Little Rattle Snake Creek
Nile Creek
Bumping River
American River
Deep Creek
Crow Creek
Little Naches River
Wenas Creek
Lmuma Creek
Umtanum Creek
Wilson Creek
Cherry Creek
Cooke Creek
Caribou Creek
Park Creek
Naneum Creek
Coleman Creek
Reever Creek
Manastash Creek
Robinson Creek
Dry Creek
Taneum Creek
Swauk Creek
First Creek
Teanaway River
Cle Elum River
Cooper River
Waptus River
Little Creek
Big Creek
Kachess River
Cabin Creek
Keechelus Lake
Hanson Creek
Lower Crab Creek
Potholes Reservoir / Moses Lake
Rocky Ford Creek (Grand Coulee)
Upper Crab Creek
Johnson Creek
Whiskey Dick Creek
Tekison Creek
Lynch Coulee
Tarpiscan Creek
Douglas Creek
Colockum Creek
Rock Island Creek
Beaver Creek
Squilchuck Creek
Wenatchee River
Mission Creek
Peshastin Creek
Ingalls Creek
Chumstick Creek
Eagle Creek
Icicle Creek
Snow Creek (Enchantment Lakes)
Eightmile Creek
Mountaineer Creek
Jack Creek
French Creek
Chiwaukum Creek
Chiwawa River
Big Meadow Creek
Phelps Creek
Fish Lake Run
Nason Creek
Whitepine Creek
Lake Wenatchee
Little Wenatchee River
White River
Napeequa River
Indian Creek
Swakane Creek
Entiat River
Mad River
Mud Creek
North Fork Entiat

Lake Chelan to Coulee Dam
Chelan River (Lake Chelan)
Twentyfive Mile Creek
Prince Creek
Railroad Creek
Stehekin River
Company Creek
Agnes Creek
Bridge Creek
Flat Creek
Methow River
Gold Creek
South Fork Gold Creek
Foggy Dew Creek
Libby Creek
Beaver Creek
Frazer Creek
Twisp River
Little Bridge Creek
Buttermilk Creek
War Creek
Bear Creek
Chewuch River
Cub Creek
Boulder Creek
Eightmile Creek
Falls Creek
Twenty Miles creek
Andrews Creek
Wolf Creek
Goat Creek
Early Winters Creek
Cedar Creek
Lost River
Eureka Creek
Robinson Creek
Swamp Creek
Okanogan River
Loup Loup Creek
Salmon Creek (Conconully Reservoir)
West Fork Salmon
North Fork Salmon
Omak Creek
No Name Creek (Omak Lake)
Kartar Creek
Wanacut Creek
Johnson Creek
Tunk Creek
Bonaparte Creek
Siwash Creek
Antoine Creek
Similkameen River
Palmer Creek (Palmer Lake)
Sinlahekin Creek
Chopaka Creek (Chopaka Lake)
Toats Coulee Creek
Cecil Creek
Ashnola River
Pasayten River
East Fork Pasayten
West Fork Pasayten
Middle Fork Pasayten
Chuchuwanteen Creek
Castle Creek
Tomasket Creek
Osoyoos Lake
Foster Creek
Coyote Creek
Nespelem River
Little Nespelem River
North Star Creek
Stepstone Creek

Upper Columbia Basin
Sanpoil River
Twentythree Mile Creek
Seventeenmile Creek
West Fork Sanpoil River
Gold Creek
Lost Creek
Cape Labelle Creek
Granite Creek
O'Brien Creek
Hawk Creek
Spokane River
Cable Creek
Spring Creek
Chamokane Creek
Little Spokane River
Deadman Creek
Dragoon Creek
Deer Creek
West Branch Little Spokane (Eloika Lake)
Deep Creek
Latah Creek (Hangman Creek)
California Creek
Rock Creek
Little Hangman Creek
Ninemile Creek
Wilmont Creek
Stranger Creek
Hall Creek
Lynx Creek
Barnaby Creek
Sherman Creek
Colville River
Mill Creek
Haller Creek
Little Pend Oreille River
Bear Creek
Stranger Creek
Stensgar Creek
Chewelah Creek
Cottonwood Creek
Huckleberry Creek
Grouse Creek
Deer Creek
Sheep Creek
Kettle River
Deadman Creek
Boulder Creek
East Deer Creek
West Deer Creek
Lon Alec Creek
Curlew Creek (Curlew Lake)
Lambert Creek
Trout Creek
Tonata Creek
Toroda Creek
Myers Creek
Mary Ann Creek
Onion Creek
Big Sheep Creek
Deep Creek
Pend Oreille River (mouth just across Canada–United States border)
Slate Creek
Sullivan Creek
Harvey Creek (Sullivan Lake)
Ruby Creek
Le Clerc Creek
Tacoma Creek
Calispell Creek
Small Creek
Winchester Creek
Skookum Creek
Priest River (itself in Idaho, but Western tributaries in Washington)
Lower West Branch Priest River
Upper West Branch Priest River
Kalispell Creek
Granite Creek

Alphabetically
American River
Amon Creek
Ashnola River
Baker River
Bear River
Beckler River
Big Quilcene River
Black River (historical)
Black River
Boeing Creek
Bogachiel River
Bone River
Bumping River
Calawah River
Canyon River
Carbon River
Cedar River (Lake Washington)
Cedar River (Willapa Bay)
Chaplain Creek
Chehalis River
Chelan River
Chewuch River
Chilliwack River
Chinook River
Chiwaukum Creek
Chiwawa River
Chumstick Creek
Cispus River
Clallam River
Cle Elum River
Clear Creek
Clearwater River (Queets River)
Clearwater River (White River)
Clover Creek
Coal Creek
Columbia River
Colville River
Cowlitz River
Crab Creek
Deep River
Depot Creek
Deschutes River
Dewatto River
Dickey River
Dosewallips River
Duckabush River
Dungeness River
Duwamish River
East Fork Miller River
East Twin River
Elk River
Elwha River
Entiat River
Fauntleroy Creek
Foss River
Gray Wolf River
Grays River
Green River (Duwamish River tributary)
Green River (Toutle River tributary)
Greenwater River
Hamma Hamma River
Hoh River
Hoko River
Humptulips River
Icicle Creek
Indian Creek (Elwha River)
Issaquah Creek
Juanita Creek
Kachess River
Kalama River
Kelsey Creek
Kettle River
Klickitat River
Lacamas Creek
Lewis River
Little Chilliwack River
Little Pend Oreille River
Little Quilcene River
Little River
Little Spokane River
Little Wenatchee River
Little White Salmon River
Lyon Creek
Mad River
Mashel River
McAleer Creek
Methow River
Middle Fork Snoqualmie River
Miller River
Muddy River
Naches River
Napeequa River
Naselle River
Nason Creek
Newaukum River
Niawiakum River
Nisqually River
Nooksack River
North Creek
North Fork Skykomish River
North Fork Snoqualmie River
North River
Okanogan River
Palouse River
Paradise River
Pend Oreille River
Pilchuck River
Pratt River
Puyallup River
Queets River
Quillayute River
Quinault River
Raging River
Rapid River
Rex River
Rock Creek (Latah Creek)
Rock Creek (Palouse River)
Sail River
Samish River
Sammamish River
Satsop River
Sauk River
Silesia Creek
Skagit River
Skokomish River
Skookumchuck River
Skykomish River
Sloan Creek
Snahapish River
Snake River
Snohomish River
Snoqualmie River
Sol Duc River
South Fork Skykomish River
South Fork Snoqualmie River
South Fork Sultan River
Spokane River
Stehekin River
Stillaguamish River
Stuck River
Sultan River
Swamp Creek
Tahuya River
Taylor Creek
Teanaway River
Thornton Creek
Tieton River
Tilton River
Tolt River
Touchet River
Toutle River
Tucannon River
Twisp River
Tye River
Union River
Van Trump Creek
Walla Walla River
Wallace River
Washougal River
Waatch River
Wells Creek
Wenatchee River
West Fork Miller River
West Twin River
White River (Puyallup River tributary)
White River (Wenatchee Lake tributary)
White Salmon River
Willapa River
Wishkah River
Wynoochee River
Yakima River

See also
List of rivers in the United States
List of rivers of the Americas by coastline

References
USGS Streamflow Data for Washington
USGS Geographic Names Information Service
USGS Hydrologic Unit Map - State of Washington (1974)

Washington rivers

Rivers